Seringai is a metal band from Jakarta, Indonesia. The band was formed in 2002 by vocalist Arian13, guitarist Ricky Siahaan, bassist Sammy Bramantyo, dan drummer Edy Khemod.

History

2002–2008: Formation and debut album
Arian13 and Ricky Siahaan decided to form a new band after Arian13's previous band Puppen disbanded, with Khemod and Toan subsequently joining them. Toan quit the band in 2004 and was replaced by Sammy Bramantyo.

Their first EP entitled High Octane Rock was released in 2004. The title was a self-description of their particular style, listing Black Sabbath, Motörhead, MC5 and Slayer among their influences. The songs released on the EP, including "Membakar Jakarta", were already popular among their growing fanbase. The band had indeed played songs from the EP frequently on their gigs before its release.

In 2007, Seringai released their debut album Serigala Militia.

2009–2012: DVD Generasi Menolak Tua and second album Taring

A box set DVD named Generasi Menolak Tua, a documentary about the band's history directed by Bramantyo, was released in 2010. Several cameos appears in the video ranging from musicians, music journalists, actress and the fans.

In April 2012, after five years without a release, Seringai released the single "Tragedi" freely via their official website. Siahaan explained that "after five years with no albums released," the band owed something to their fans.

The second album Taring was released two months later in July 2012, selling 999 copies in the first two days. Prior to the release, the band said that heavy rock influence is dominant in the album, while the lyrics are critical about social and political issues. Others have a science fiction theme.

2013–present: Opening act for Metallica and Future

On 25 August 2013, Seringai was billed as the only opening act for Metallica concert in Jakarta.

In November 2013 Seringai released their second EP titled Tragedi/Sang lelaki. It's a 7" vinyl record containing the song "Tragedi" and a previously unreleased track "Sang Lelaki". The EP was a limited edition of 300 copies, and all were sold out by the time of the record release.

Band members
Current members
 Arian "Arian13" Arifin — vocals (2002–present)
 Ricky Siahaan — guitars (2002–present)
 Edy Khemod — drums (2002–present)
 Sammy Bramantyo — bass guitar (2004–present)

Former members
 Toan — bass guitar (2002–2004)

Timeline

Discography

Studio albums

Extended plays

Singles

DVD

References

External links
 Official website
 Seringai discography on Discogs

Indonesian heavy metal musical groups
Musical groups established in 2002
Indonesian musical groups
Anugerah Musik Indonesia winners